There have been three baronetcies created with the surname Shirley, two in the Baronetage of England and one in the Baronetage of Great Britain. Only the first creation remains extant as of 2016.

The Shirley Baronetcy, of Staunton in the County of Leicester, was created in the Baronetage of England on 22 May 1611. For more information on this creation, see the Earl Ferrers.

The Shirley Baronetcy, of Preston in the County of Sussex, was created in the Baronetage of England on 6 March 1666 for Anthony Shirley, Member of Parliament for Arundel, Sussex and Steyning. The title became extinct on the death of the third Baronet in 1705.

The Shirley Baronetcy, of Oat Hall in the County of Sussex, was created in the Baronetage of Great Britain on 27 June 1786 for Thomas Shirley, Governor of the Bahamas, of Dominica and of the Leeward Islands. The title became extinct on the death of the second Baronet in 1815.

Shirley baronets, of Staunton (1611)
see the Earl Ferrers

Shirley baronets, of Preston (1666)

Sir Anthony Shirley, 1st Baronet (1624–1683)
Sir Richard Shirley, 2nd Baronet (–1692)
Sir Richard Shirley, 3rd Baronet (c. 1680–1705)

Shirley baronets, of Oat Hall (1786)
Sir Thomas Shirley, 1st Baronet (1727–1800)
Sir William Warden Shirley, 2nd Baronet (1772–1815)

References

 

Baronetcies in the Baronetage of England
Extinct baronetcies in the Baronetage of England
Extinct baronetcies in the Baronetage of Great Britain
1611 establishments in England